The 1973 Individual Ice Speedway World Championship was the eighth edition of the World Championship.

The winner was Gabdrakhman Kadyrov of the Soviet Union for the sixth time.

Final 
 March 10–11
  Inzell

References

Ice speedway competitions
Ice